Foulney Island is a low-lying grass and shingle area 1 mile (1.6 km) to the south-east of Roa Island, off the southern tip of the Furness Peninsula in Cumbria, England. Foulney Island is one of the Islands of Furness in Morecambe Bay, northern England. For local government purposes the island is in the borough of Barrow-in-Furness. It has an area of about 40 acres (16 ha). In earlier times it was known as Fowle Island.

The island is connected to the mainland via a shingle and rock causeway which was built in Victorian times as a tidal protection measure. The Foulney causeway leaves the Roa Island causeway halfway along its length on the eastern side. The maximum elevation on the island is no more than 10 feet (3 metres) above the high tide level. At the time of highest tides much of the island can be inundated. There are no permanent inhabitants on the island.

Bird sanctuary
Foulney is a bird sanctuary and is included in the South Walney & Piel Channel Flats Site of Special Scientific Interest (SSSI).

Since 1974 the island has been managed by the Cumbria Wildlife Trust. During the summer months the island is wardened and visitors are discouraged from walking in the nesting areas. Bird species observed at Foulney include:

Sandwich tern; occasional.
Little tern
Arctic tern; Foulney is the only breeding location in north-west England.
Common tern
Roseate tern; rare.
Eurasian oystercatcher
Ringed plover
Golden plover
Grey plover
Brent goose
Red-breasted merganser
Great crested grebe
Common scoter
Redshank
Meadow pipit
Common eider
Dunlin
Knot
Sanderling
Eurasian curlew
Eurasian whimbrel
Black-tailed godwit

Getting to Foulney

Access to Foulney Island involves a walk of about a mile along the causeway. Visitors should not take dogs and should avoid the nesting grounds during the breeding season. In recent times (2004/2005) the area has become popular with cockle and mussel pickers. There is some concern locally that damage might be done to the nesting sites if these activities continue to expand. Also, worry for the safety of the cocklers has increased since the 2004 Morecambe Bay cockling disaster, in which 21 Chinese cocklers drowned. Foulney and its immediate surrounds are popular with fishermen and windsurfers.

References

Lost Lancashire by A.L.Evans.

Islands of Furness
Uninhabited islands of England
Barrow-in-Furness
Birdwatching sites in England
Nature reserves of the Cumbria Wildlife Trust
Sites of Special Scientific Interest in Cumbria